Serine/threonine-protein phosphatase 2B catalytic subunit gamma isoform (PP2BC) is an enzyme that in humans is encoded by the PPP3CC gene.

Calmodulin-dependent protein phosphatase, calcineurin, is involved in a wide range of biologic activities, acting as a Ca(2+)-dependent modifier of phosphorylation status. 

In testis, the motility of the sperm is thought to be controlled by cAMP-dependent phosphorylation and a unique form of calcineurin appears to be associated with the flagellum. The calcineurin holoenzyme is composed of catalytic and regulatory subunits of 60 and 18 kD, respectively. 

At least 3 genes, calcineurin A-alpha (CALNA1; MIM 114105), calcineurin A-beta (CALNA2; MIM 114106), and calcineurin A-gamma (CALNA3), have been cloned for the catalytic subunit. These genes have been identified in humans, mice, and rats, and are highly conserved between species (90 to 95% amino acid identity).[supplied by OMIM]

References

Further reading